Francis Edgar Dodd  (29 November 1874 – 7 March 1949) was a British portrait painter, landscape artist and printmaker.

Biography

Dodd was born in Holyhead, Anglesey, Wales, the son of a Wesleyan minister. He trained at the Glasgow School of Art alongside Muirhead Bone, who married Dodd's sister, Gertrude. At Glasgow, Dodd won the Haldane Scholarship in 1893 and then travelled around France, Italy and later Spain. Dodd returned to England in 1895 and settled in Manchester, becoming friends with Charles Holden, before moving to Blackheath in London in 1904.

During World War I, in 1916, he was appointed an official war artist by Charles Masterman, the head of the War Propaganda Bureau, WPB. Serving on the Western Front, he produced more than 30 portraits of senior military figures. 
However, he also earned a considerable peacetime reputation for the quality of his watercolours and portrait commissions. He was appointed a trustee of the Tate Gallery in 1929, a position he held for six years, and was elected as an Associate of the Royal Academy in 1927 and a full Member in 1935.

From 1911 Dodd lived at Arundel House (51 Blackheath Park) in Blackheath, London SE3, until he killed himself in 1949.

References

External links

 
Works by Francis Dodd in the collections of the Imperial War Museum
Portrait of Francis Dodd by Stephen Bone on the ArtUK website

1874 births
1949 suicides
19th-century Welsh painters
19th-century Welsh male artists
20th-century British printmakers
20th-century Welsh painters
20th-century Welsh male artists
Alumni of the Glasgow School of Art
Artists who committed suicide
British Army personnel of World War I
British war artists
People from Holyhead
Royal Academicians
Suicides by gas
Suicides in Greater London
Welsh male painters
Welsh portrait painters
World War I artists